Knut Toven (11 March 1897 – 18 November 1980) was a Norwegian politician for the Christian Democratic Party.

He was elected to the Norwegian Parliament from Møre og Romsdal in 1950, and was re-elected on four occasions.

Toven was born in Nesset and mayor of Nesset municipality between 1928 and 1951.

References

1897 births
1980 deaths
Christian Democratic Party (Norway) politicians
Members of the Storting
20th-century Norwegian politicians